This page is a subsection of the list of sequence alignment software.

Multiple alignment visualization tools typically serve four purposes:
 Aid general understanding of large-scale DNA or protein alignments
 Visualize alignments for figures and publication
 Manually edit and curate automatically generated alignments
 Analysis in depth

The rest of this article is focused on only multiple global alignments of homologous proteins. The first two are a natural consequence of most representations of alignments and their annotation being human-unreadable and best portrayed in the familiar sequence row and alignment column format, of which examples are widespread in the literature. The third is necessary because algorithms for both multiple sequence alignment and structural alignment use heuristics which do not always perform perfectly. The fourth is a great example of how interactive graphical tools enable a worker involved in sequence analysis to conveniently execute a variety if different computational tools to explore an alignment's phylogenetic implications; or, to predict the structure and functional properties of a specific sequence, e.g., comparative modelling.

Alignment viewers, editors

See also
 Sequence alignment software
 Biological data visualization
 Comparison of software for molecular mechanics modeling

Lists of bioinformatics software
Software